Ứng Hòa is a southern district (huyện) of Hanoi in the Red River Delta region of Vietnam. The River Đáy forms much of the western boundary with Mỹ Đức district. It has 28 communes and one town.

Administrative divisions
The district contains the following subdivisions:
Vân Đình (town)
Communes:

Đại Hùng
Đồng Tân
Hòa Lâm
Hòa Xá
Liên Bạt
Phù Lưu
Sơn Công
Trung Tú
Viên An
Cao Thành
Đội Bình
Đồng Tiến
Hòa Nam
Hồng Quang
Lưu Hoàng
Phương Tú
Tảo Dương Văn
Trường Thịnh
Viên Nội
Đại Cường
Đông Lỗ
Hoa Sơn
Hòa Phú
Kim Đường
Minh Đức 	
Quảng Phú Cầu
Trầm Lộng 	
Vạn Thá

References

Districts of Hanoi